Peace of Mind is the second and final studio album by English pop band Breathe. It was released on 20 August 1990 in the United Kingdom by Siren Records, and on 4 September 1990 by A&M records in the United States.

Two years after the band burst onto the music scene with the hits "Hands to Heaven" and "How Can I Fall?" from their debut album All That Jazz (1987), this album brought the group back to the charts with two more hit singles. Despite their renewed success from the two hit singles, reviews were generally mixed, with some praising lead singer David Glasper's "strong, soulful voice", while others dismissed the album itself as "a bit too seamless and proper to sink in deeply".

Peace of Mind peaked at No. 116 on the US Billboard 200, while the singles "Say a Prayer" and "Does She Love That Man?" both reached their highest positions on the US Adult Contemporary chart at Nos. 3 and 17, respectively. "Say Hello" was released as a single in the United Kingdom, where it peaked at No. 87 on the Top 100 singles chart.

The song "Where Angels Fear" was later covered by American contemporary Christian artist Clay Crosse under the title "Where Angels Dare" in 1993.

Track listing

B-Sides 

 "May Lightning Strike" was only available in releases to the UK. "Say It" was only available in some releases.

Interview cassette
"An Interview and Music with Breathe's David Glasper"  
 Released: 1990
 Label: Siren
 Format: Cassette single
Promotional audio cassette featuring an interview with Glasper, inter-cut with a portion of Hands to Heaven, from their first album All That Jazz, and songs from their sophomore album Peace of Mind. In this interview, David talks about the background behind writing the album, and behind the meaning and ideas of some of the individual songs, like the three singles from that album, including Say Hello,  Does She Love That Man and Say a Prayer, though other songs from the album are also discussed. Along with this, David discusses his inspirations for the songs, as well as inspirations from other artists.

Personnel

Band 
 David Glasper – lead vocals, backing vocals 
 Marcus Lillington – keyboards, programming, guitars 
 Ian Spice – drums

Guest musicians 
 Richard Cottle – keyboards
 Merv De Peyer – keyboard programming 
 Georgie Fame – organ
 Bob Sargeant – keyboards, organ
 Danny Schogger – keyboards
 Francis White – keyboards 
 Jim Williams – guitars
 Jaz Lochrie – bass  
 Charlie Morgan – drum programming 
 Marc Fox – percussion
 Phil Smith – saxophones 
 Andy Caine – backing vocals
 Carol Kenyon – backing vocals
 Beverley Green – backing vocals 
 Juliet Roberts – backing vocals

Production 
 Producers – Breathe and Bob Sargeant
 Engineer – John Gallen
 Assistant Engineers – Chris Brown, Tristan Powell and Simon Van Zwanenberg.
 Mixed by Julian Mendelsohn
 Mix Assistants – Steve Fitzmaurice and Danton Supple
 Remixing – Daniel Abraham on "Say A Prayer" 
 Mastered by Ian Cooper
 A&R – Simon Hicks
 Art Direction and Design – John Warwicker at Vivid I.D.
 Management – Jonny Too Bad and Paul King
 Photography – Martin Brading

Chart performance 

In the U.S., Peace of Mind spent 20 weeks on the Billboard 200 from 22 September 1990, peaking at No. 116 on 3 November. In the UK, the album failed to enter the Top 100 albums chart.

Singles 
Three singles were issued from Peace of Mind: "Say a Prayer" was issued in the United States during August 1990 as the first single from the album. In the United Kingdom, Siren Records released "Say Hello" as the first album single on 3 September 1990, followed in October by "Say a Prayer". The third single, "Does She Love That Man?" was released in November 1990, with A&M Records in the United States billing the artist as ‘Breathe featuring David Glasper’.

While a fourth commercial single did not eventuate from Peace of Mind, A&M Records issued "Without Your Love" to radio in the U.S. as a promotional single, with the artist being billed again as ‘Breathe featuring David Glasper’.

References 

1990 albums
Breathe (British band) albums
A&M Records albums
Virgin Records albums
Albums produced by Bob Sargeant